SingleTrac Entertainment Technologies was an American video game developer, mostly for the PlayStation platform. The management team and much of the original development team came from Evans & Sutherland, bringing their 3D graphics and software engineering skills into the video game industry. Its most famous titles were the Twisted Metal and Jet Moto video game series.

The company's first two games, WarHawk and Twisted Metal, were major critical and commercial successes, leading publisher Sony Computer Entertainment to contract two further games from SingleTrac. SingleTrac had ambitions of becoming a video game publisher as well as developer, and in early 1997 signed a deal with Microsoft to enable them to publish PC games, but these plans never came to fruition. Later in 1997 SingleTrac signed on as a developer for the Nintendo 64, but they ultimately never produced any Nintendo 64 games. After producing the two contracted games for Sony Computer Entertainment, SingleTrac was bought by the video game publisher GT Interactive, which was then bought by the French company Infogrames.

The SingleTrac studio was closed down in 2000.

Lineage
A group of SingleTrac employees broke off and formed the game studio Incognito Entertainment in 1999, and went on to make some additional entries in the former SingleTrac franchise Twisted Metal and a sequel to SingleTrac's first game WarHawk, both for Sony Computer Entertainment. In 2009 most of the team members left Incognito to form Eat Sleep Play and LightBox Interactive rendering Incognito defunct. Both studios would go on to develop the same two former SingleTrac franchises Incognito made entries in - Eat Sleep Play developed a PS3 entry in the Twisted Metal series and LightBox Interactive developed a spiritual successor to the Warhawk series, Starhawk. Eat Sleep Play transitioned to mobile development right before releasing its PS3 entry in the Twisted Metal series and shutting down in 2017. LightBox Interactive's contract with Sony expired right after the release of Starhawk and is considered defunct since 2012.

Developed games
WarHawk (PlayStation, 1995)
Twisted Metal (PlayStation, 1995)
Twisted Metal 2 (PlayStation, PC, 1996)
Jet Moto (PlayStation, PC, 1996)
Jet Moto 2 (PlayStation, 1997)
Critical Depth (PlayStation, 1997)
Rogue Trip: Vacation 2012 (PlayStation, 1998)
Streak: Hoverboard Racing (PlayStation, 1998)
Outwars (PC, 1998)
Animorphs: Shattered Reality (PlayStation, 2000)

References

1995 establishments in Utah
Companies based in Salt Lake City
Defunct video game companies of the United States
Video game companies based in Utah
Video game companies disestablished in 2000
Video game companies established in 1995
Video game development companies